EchoStar Corporation is an American company, a worldwide provider of satellite communication and Internet services through its Hughes Network Systems and EchoStar Satellite Services business segments. EchoStar is based out of unincorporated Arapahoe County, Colorado.

Prior to 2008, it operated the DISH Network service brand, which was spun off as DISH on January 1, 2008.

History 
EchoStar was originally formed in 1980 by its chairman Charles Ergen as a distributor of C band TV systems. In 1987, it applied for a direct broadcast satellite (DBS) license with the Federal Communications Commission and was granted access to orbital slot 119° west longitude in 1992.

On December 28, 1995, the firm successfully launched its first satellite, EchoStar I. On March 4, 1996, it established the DISH Network brand name to market its home satellite TV system.

On January 2, 2008, the DISH Network business was demerged from the technology and infrastructure side of the business. A split in the shares created two companies; the former EchoStar Communications Corporation changed its name to DISH Network Corporation which consisted mainly of the DISH Network business, and EchoStar Corporation, which retained ownership of the technology side including the satellites, Sling Media, and the set-top box development arm. DISH Network completed its distribution to EchoStar of its digital set-top box business, certain infrastructure, and other assets and related liabilities, including certain of their satellites, uplink and satellite transmission assets, and real estate (the "Spin-off"). Since the Spin-off, EchoStar and DISH Network have operated as separate publicly traded companies. In addition, a substantial majority of the voting power of the shares of DISH Network and EchoStar is owned beneficially by Charles W. Ergen, Chairman, and by certain trusts established by Mr. Ergen for the benefit of his family.

On February 14, 2011, EchoStar announced that it would acquire Hughes Communications in a deal valued at US$1.3 billion.

On January 31, 2017, EchoStar announced that it had reached an agreement with DISH to transfer the EchoStar Technologies businesses, which designed, developed and distributed digital set-top boxes, provided satellite uplinking and broadcast services and developed and supported streaming video technology back to DISH. The transaction was completed on January 31, 2017, substantially returning DISH to its pre-2008 status as a set-top-box hardware manufacturer.

In March 2017, after two delays caused by weather worries, SpaceX delivered EchoStar XXIII into orbit. The satellite was launched on a Falcon 9 Rocket and provides broadcast services for Brazil. Because EchoStar XXIII is a heavy satellite, this mission did not include a rocket landing post-takeoff, as it would require too much fuel. This was the first time a purely commercial satellite was launched from a pad that once served as the base for Apollo moon trips and space shuttle flights.

On May 20, 2019, EchoStar announced that it had reached an agreement with DISH Network Corporation to transfer the portion of the business which managed and provided broadcast satellite services, referred to as the BSS (Broadcast Satellite Services) business, to DISH in order to concentrate on broadband services and other initiatives. The transaction was completed on September 10, 2019.

Satellite fleet 
Orbital locations may change
Since EchoStar frequently moves satellites among its many orbiting slots this list is not immediately accurate.
Refer to Lyngsat.com for detailed satellite information.

References 

 
Communications satellite operators
Telecommunications companies of the United States
Telecommunications companies established in 1980
Companies listed on the Nasdaq
2008 mergers and acquisitions
2011 mergers and acquisitions